Seafarer Glacier is a tributary glacier draining southward from Webb Névé, between the Lawrence Peaks and Malta Plateau, to enter Mariner Glacier, in Victoria Land. So named by the Mariner Glacier party of New Zealand Geological Survey Antarctic Expedition (NZGSAE), 1966–67, both in association with the name Mariner, and also with the `Seafarer', the Anglo-Saxon fragment-poem about travel over icy seas.

References

Glaciers of Victoria Land
Borchgrevink Coast